The Lancaster Memorial  is a memorial in the northern Luxembourg locality of Weiswampach, which was erected 60 years after World War II in memory of 14 allied airmen, 13 of whom died on the spot and one who was made prisoner by the Germans. During the night from 12 to 13 August 1944 their aircraft, two Avro Lancasters, were shot down.

External links 
 Lancaster Mémorial

Luxembourg in World War II
Monuments and memorials in Luxembourg
Weiswampach